is a feminine Japanese given name which is occasionally used by men.

Possible writings
Chiharu can be written using different kanji characters and can mean:
千春, "thousand, spring"
千晴, "thousand, sunny weather"
知春, "wisdom, spring"
The name can also be written in hiragana or katakana.

People with the name
Chiharu Araki (千陽, born 1982), Japanese politician 
Chiharu Icho (千春, born 1981), Japanese wrestler
Chiharu Igaya (千春, born 1931), Japanese Olympic alpine skier
Chiharu Kawai (千春, born 1973), Japanese actress, model, and voice actress
Chiharu Kitaoka (千陽, born 1988), Japanese voice actress
Chiharu Matsuyama (千春, born 1955), Japanese singer-songwriter
, Japanese swimmer
, Japanese businesswoman and singer
Chiharu Nakamura (知春, born 1988), Japanese rugby sevens player
Chiharu Niiyama (千春), a Japanese actress and gravure idol
, Japanese speed skater
, Japanese male boxer
Chiharu Saiguchi (千晴, born 1938), Justice of the Supreme Court of Japan
, Japanese voice actor
, Japanese badminton player 
, Japanese performance and installation artist
Chiharu Suzuka (千春, born 1958), Japanese voice actress
Chiharu Tezuka (ちはる, born 1974), Japanese voice actress

Fictional characters
Chiharu Eniwa, a character in the manga series Girl Got Game
Chiharu Harukaze (千桜), a character from the manga and anime series Hayate the Combat Butler
Chiharu Mihara (千春), a character in the anime and manga series Cardcaptor Sakura
Chiharu Nitta (千春), a character in the anime and manga series Boys Be...
Chiharu Shinonome (千春), the main character of the manga and anime series Eiken
Chiharu Tanaka (千春), a character in the manga series Lovely Complex
Chiharu Mori (千春), a character in the romantic comedy manga series Dengeki Daisy

Japanese feminine given names
Japanese unisex given names